Riboflavin:NAD(P)+ oxidoreductase may refer to:
 Riboflavin reductase (NAD(P)H), an enzyme
 FMN reductase, an enzyme